Kopin Liu (born 25 January 1949) is a Taiwanese physical chemist.

Liu is a 1971 graduate of National Tsing Hua University. He moved to the United States to pursue a doctorate at Ohio State University. Liu began his research career at the Georgia Institute of Technology. After one year, he moved to Argonne National Laboratory, where he remained until 1993. Since his return to Taiwan, Liu has held several posts at Academia Sinica. He said in 2000 that working at Academia Sinica meant a large pay cut, but that he returned to teach Taiwan's future scientists while working on research. Liu received two five-year grants as a fellow of the Foundation for the Advancement of Outstanding Scholarship, an organization founded by Yuan T. Lee in 1994. In 1998, Liu was granted fellowship by the American Physical Society. Equivalent honors were bestowed by The World Academy of Sciences in 2005, and the Royal Society of Chemistry in 2013. He became a member of the Academia Sinica in 2004 and the European Academy of Sciences in 2018. Liu has served as distinguished research chair professor within the department of physics at National Taiwan University since 2010. From 2010 to 2012, Liu was honorary chair professor at National Tsing Hua University. He is a 2011 recipient of the Humboldt Research Award.

References

Living people
1949 births
Taiwanese chemists
20th-century Taiwanese scientists
21st-century Taiwanese scientists
20th-century chemists
21st-century chemists
Members of Academia Sinica
Fellows of the Royal Society of Chemistry
Fellows of the American Physical Society
Physical chemists
National Tsing Hua University alumni
Ohio State University alumni
Argonne National Laboratory people
Academic staff of the National Taiwan University
Humboldt Research Award recipients
Chemical physicists